Ichhunayuq (Quechua ichhuna sickle, -yuq a suffix to indicate ownership, "the one with a sickle", Hispanicized spelling Ichunayoc) is a mountain in the Andes of Peru, about  high. It is located in the Cusco Region, Calca Province, on the border of the districts of Coya and Pisac. Ichhunayuq lies at the archaeological site of Písac, northwest of the town.

See also 
 Machu Kuntur Sinqa

References

Mountains of Peru
Mountains of Cusco Region